In mathematics, inertial manifolds are concerned with the long term behavior of the solutions of dissipative dynamical systems.  Inertial manifolds are finite-dimensional, smooth, invariant manifolds that contain the global attractor and attract all solutions exponentially quickly.  Since an inertial manifold is finite-dimensional even if the original system is infinite-dimensional, and because most of the dynamics for the system takes place on the inertial manifold,  studying the dynamics on an inertial manifold produces a considerable simplification in the study of the dynamics of the original system.

In many physical applications, inertial manifolds express an interaction law between the small and large wavelength structures.  Some say that the small wavelengths are enslaved by the large (e.g. synergetics).  Inertial manifolds may also appear as slow manifolds common in meteorology, or as the center manifold in any bifurcation.  Computationally, numerical schemes for partial differential equations seek to capture the long term dynamics and so such numerical schemes form an approximate inertial manifold.

Introductory Example

Consider the dynamical system in just two variables  and  and with parameter :

 This manifold is invariant under the dynamics because on the manifold 
  which is the same as
 
 The manifold  attracts all trajectories in some finite domain around the origin because near the origin   (although the strict definition below requires attraction from all initial conditions).

Hence the long term behavior of the original two dimensional dynamical system is given by the 'simpler' one dimensional dynamics on the inertial manifold , namely .

Definition

Let  denote a solution of a dynamical system.

In many cases of interest the evolution of  is determined as the solution of a differential equation in , say  with initial value .
In any case, we assume the solution of the dynamical system can be written in terms of a semigroup operator, or state transition matrix,  such that  for all times  and all initial values .
In some situations we might consider only discrete values of time as in the dynamics of a map.

An inertial manifold for a dynamical semigroup  is a smooth manifold  such that
  is of finite dimension,
  for all times ,
  attracts all solutions exponentially quickly, that is, for every initial value  there exist constants  such that .

The restriction of the differential equation  to the inertial manifold  is therefore a well defined finite-dimensional system called the inertial system.
Subtly, there is a difference between a manifold being attractive, and solutions on the manifold being attractive.
Nonetheless, under appropriate conditions the inertial system possesses so-called asymptotic completeness: that is, every solution of the differential equation has a companion solution lying in  and producing the same behavior for large time; in mathematics, for all  there exists  and possibly a time shift  such that  as .

Researchers in the 2000s generalized such inertial manifolds to time dependent (nonautonomous) and/or stochastic dynamical systems (e.g.)

Existence

Existence results that have been proved address inertial manifolds that are expressible as a graph.
The governing differential equation is rewritten more specifically in the form  for unbounded self-adjoint closed operator  with domain , and nonlinear operator .

For some given number  of modes,  denotes the projection of  onto the space spanned by , and  denotes the orthogonal projection onto the space spanned by .
We look for an inertial manifold expressed as the graph .
For this graph to exist the most restrictive requirement is the spectral gap condition  where the constant  depends upon the system.
This spectral gap condition requires that the spectrum of  must contain large gaps to be guaranteed of existence.

Approximate inertial manifolds
Several methods are proposed to construct approximations to
inertial manifolds, including the
so-called intrinsic low-dimensional manifolds.

The most popular way to approximate follows from the
existence of a graph.
Define the  slow variables , and the 'infinite'
fast variables .
Then project the differential equation
 onto both 
and  to obtain the coupled system
 and
.

For trajectories on the graph of an inertial
manifold , the fast
variable .
Differentiating and using the coupled system form gives the
differential equation for the graph:

This differential equation is typically solved approximately
in an asymptotic expansion in 'small'  to
give an invariant manifold model,
or a nonlinear Galerkin method,
both of which use a global basis whereas the so-called
holistic discretisation uses a local basis.
Such approaches to approximation of inertial manifolds are
very closely related to approximating center manifolds
for which a web service exists to construct approximations
for systems input by a
user.

See also
 Wandering set

References

Dynamical systems